Jammin' with Gene is an album by saxophonist Gene Ammons recorded in 1956 and released on the Prestige label.

Reception

The AllMusic review by Scott Yanow stated: "this is an excellent (and rather spontaneous) straightahead session".

Track listing 
 "Jammin' With Gene" (Gene Ammons) - 14:15     
 "We'll Be Together Again" (Carl T. Fischer, Frankie Laine) - 10:00     
 "Not Really the Blues" (Johnny Mandel) - 16:06

Personnel 
Gene Ammons - tenor saxophone
Donald Byrd, Art Farmer - trumpet
Jackie McLean - alto saxophone
Mal Waldron - piano
Doug Watkins - bass
Art Taylor - drums

References 

Gene Ammons albums
1956 albums
Prestige Records albums
Albums recorded at Van Gelder Studio